Erik Nedeau (born August 30, 1971), is a former international class middle-distance runner.

Early life and education
Nedeau grew up in Kennebunk, Maine and graduated from Northeastern University in Boston, Massachusetts in 1994.

Achievements
At the 5th IAAF World Indoor Championships in Athletics, held in Barcelona, Spain in March 1995, Erik Nedeau won the bronze medal in the 1500 meters with a time of 3:44.91. He finished third less than half a second behind 1500 world record holder Hicham El Guerrouj of Morocco (3:44.54) and Mateo Cañellas of Spain (3:44.85)

US Rankings according to Track and Field News

800 meters:
1992 7th,
1994 10th,
1995 8th.

1500 meters:
1994 7th,
1995 5th,
1996 6th.

Personal bests

800 meters: 1:46.19,
1000 meters: 2:19.18,
1500 meters: 3:38.24,
One Mile: 3:57

Current activity
Head coach of men's cross country and track Erik Nedeau resigned on Jan. 25 after 20 seasons with the team due to “personal and family reasons,” according to Director of Athletics Don Faulstick.

References

External links
Track and Field News 1500 National Championships Results
Amherst bio

1971 births
Northeastern University alumni
Track and field athletes from Maine
People from Kennebunk, Maine
Living people